Il Fornaretto di Venezia (US TV title: The Scapegoat, French title Le Petit Boulanger de Venise or, alternatively, Le Procès des Doges — as seen on the poster) is a 1963 Italian-French film directed by Duccio Tessari who co-wrote the screenplay with Marcello Fondato, based on a novel by Francesco Dall'Ongaro.

Plot 
It tells the story of 16th century Venice where a young worker is sentenced to death on the suspicion of attacking a noble.

Cast
Jacques Perrin as  Pietro, il fornaretto 
Michèle Morgan as  Princess Sofia 
Enrico Maria Salerno as  Lorenzo Barbo 
Sylva Koscina as  Clemenza, Barbo's Wife 
Stefania Sandrelli as  Anella 
Gastone Moschin as  Consigliere Garzone 
Fred Williams as  Alvise  
Mario Brega    
Renato Terra

References

External links

 

1963 films
Films directed by Duccio Tessari
Films set in Venice
Films set in the 16th century
Lux Film films
1960s historical drama films
1960s mystery drama films
Italian historical drama films
Italian mystery drama films
Historical mystery films
1960s Italian films